

Surnames 
 Aimé Molinié (1908–2001),  French politician;
 Émile Molinié (1877–c.1964), French architect;
 Éric Molinié;
 Georges Molinié (1944–2014), French philologist 
 Hector Molinié (1872–1956), French politician;
 Jean Molinié (1868–1936), French politician;
 Jean-Baptiste Molinié (1880–1971), French general of World War II;
 Marc Molinié (1960– ), French Rallying driver;
 Marie-Dominique Molinié(1918–2002) French theologian.

Disambiguation pages with surname-holder lists